Burton-on-Trent railway station is a mainline railway station located in the town of Burton upon Trent, Staffordshire, England. It is owned by Network Rail and managed by East Midlands Railway, although only CrossCountry services call at the station.

History

First station (1839-1883)

The original Burton on Trent station was opened in 1839 by the Birmingham and Derby Junction Railway on its original route from Derby to Hampton-in-Arden meeting the London and Birmingham Railway for London. The station originally consisted of a hut and an adjacent level crossing. A more substantial two-storey building was later constructed.

Second station (1883-1970)

In 1881, an increase in passengers and goods using the railway led to the old station being demolished and a temporary island platform constructed. A new station was constructed 150 yards further south and separated from the roadway on the bridge by iron palisading. There was a large covered cab-stand, which offered access to the booking hall, 65 ft wide, 27 ft deep and 35 ft high in the early English style, partly timbered. The stairs provided access to the island platform on which were built waiting rooms for ladies and gentlemen, and a first-class refreshment and dining room and a third-class refreshment room. A WH Smith newsagent stall was also located on the platform. The platforms were covered with a glass canopy and extended close to one-quarter of a mile in length. The station was designed by the company architect John Holloway Sanders and erected by Messrs Cox of Leicester. The bridge was constructed under the supervision of the company engineer, Mr. Campion. The new station re-opened in 1883.

These all closed to passenger traffic between 1960 and 1965.

Third station (1970-present)

As part of the British Railways modernisation plans, the station was rebuilt again in 1970. Of the previous station, only the staircase down to platform level remains. During the summer and autumn of 2011, the station underwent a £700,000 refurbishment, including removal of asbestos, improved facilities for disabled people, improved lighting and a refurbished waiting room.

In late 2019, the forecourt in front of the station was redeveloped to add a new taxi rank and bus departure bays.

Station Masters

J. Hackett ca. 1850
Mr. Harrison 1860 - 1866 
Joseph Heaton 1866 - 1870
Joseph Hawkins 1871 - 1893
George Cook 1893 - 1901 (afterwards station master at Derby)
John Morton Jacques 1901 - 1916 (formerly station master at Market Harborough)
Thomas Pitt 1916  - 1922 (formerly station master at St Albans)
Harry l’Anson 1922 - 1927
John Winnington 1927 - 1928
Arthur Ernest Chandler 1928  - 1932 (formerly station master at Cheltenham, afterwards station master at Leeds)
T. W. Leach 1932 - 1938 (formerly station master at Mansfield)
E. A Stafford 1938 - 1942
E. Nadin 1942 - 1944 (formerly station master at East Ham)
Frank J. Mayall 1944 - 1947 (afterwards station master at Derby)
H. F. J. Lyons 1947 - 1950 (formerly station master at Plaistow)
J.W. Dodd 1950 - ????
George R. Hemming 1957 - 1960 (afterwards station master at Northampton)
Frank Sutcliffe 1960 - 1964 (formerly station master at Hebden Bridge)

Facilities

Access to the station is from the bridge on Borough Road which crosses the railway line. At road level, there is a taxi rank, a shop and the station entrance which contains the ticket office. In order to reach the two platforms, passengers descend a broad staircase. A lift is also available.

Only a single building now stands at the platform level (Burton is an island station where the tracks run around a single platform) and this building incorporates a waiting room, toilets and a despatcher's office. Timetable information is available from destination boards and real-time customer information screens with automated train announcements. There is a ramp for step-free access between the two platforms.

The station has the PlusBus scheme where train and bus tickets can be bought together at a saving.

Motive power depot

As a centre for beer brewing, Burton generated a great deal of freight traffic. Burton itself was criss-crossed by the lines of the brewery companies' private lines with a plethora of level crossings. In 1870 a new locomotive shed was built to the south of the station. This consisted of a roundhouse built round a  turntable. In 1892 another roundhouse was added with a  turntable. Originally coded "2" by the Midland Railway, it became 17B in 1935.

By 1948 the depot had 111 locomotives allocated to it. With the arrival of diesel locomotives,  a reorganisation of motive power districts in the London Midland Region took place in September 1963. Under this, the former Nottingham (16), Derby (17) and Toton (18) divisions were amalgamated, with Toton as the main shed for the division; this was coded 16A, and Burton-on-Trent became 16F. Steam traction was removed from this depot in September 1966  and it closed to steam in 1968, but carried on for diesel locomotive fuelling and stabling.

Services

The station lies on the Cross Country Route, between Derby and Birmingham.

The station's operator is East Midlands Railway, but no East Midlands Railway trains call there. All services are provided by CrossCountry, with Regional trains between Cardiff, Birmingham and Nottingham, as well as longer-distance services to destinations such as,  and Edinburgh. The Nottingham - Birmingham services call every half hour each way (alternate trains continue to Cardiff), with two-hourly calls by the Edinburgh - Plymouth, Plymouth - Edinburgh trains.

Future
It has been proposed in the past that the line between Burton and Leicester, known as the Ivanhoe Line, to be reopened for passenger use.  Services had originally been withdrawn in 1964 due to the Beeching Axe, though the line is still open for freight traffic. In January 2019, an action group called Campaign to Re-Open The Ivanhoe Line (CRIL) was formed in Swadlincote to campaign for the reopening of the line.

In June 2019, the Derby Telegraph published an article showing support for the reopening of the South Staffordshire Line for trams. According to the article, London-based consultants Cushman and Wakefield had put forward suggestions to both Staffordshire County Council and East Staffordshire Borough Council to look at bringing trams into Burton to promote tourism and businesses.

In literature
The station, the railway sheds and the town's popular trainspotting locations feature significantly in the autobiographical book, Platform Souls by local author Nicholas Whittaker.

References

Further reading

External links

Railway stations in Staffordshire
DfT Category D stations
Former Midland Railway stations
Railway stations in Great Britain opened in 1839
Railway stations in Great Britain closed in 1883
Railway stations in Great Britain opened in 1883
Railway stations served by CrossCountry
Burton upon Trent
1839 establishments in England
1883 disestablishments in England
Railway stations in Great Britain not served by their managing company